Dholera International Airport  is an under-construction international airport and a greenfield airport, which will serve the Dholera Special Investment Region (DSIR) in Gujarat, India. It is being built near Navagam in the Dholera taluka of Ahmedabad district.

The airport would serve the logistics requirements of the DSIR, which is planned as a huge industrial township in the Delhi–Mumbai Industrial Corridor (DMIC) project, as well as to relieve congestion of the existing Sardar Vallabhbhai Patel International Airport serving the cities of Ahmedabad and Gandhinagar, the capital of Gujarat. It is expected to be commissioned by December 2025.

Development
The Airports Authority of India (AAI) inspected the site in January 2010 to carry out a techno-economical feasibility study and gave its technical clearance the following month. The project received "site clearance" from the central government in July 2014. The Environment Ministry gave its approval in December 2015.

Dholera International Airport Company Ltd (DIACL) was set up in 2012 by the State Government of Gujarat as a special-purpose vehicle to develop the airport. The Airports Authority of India picked up a 51% stake in DIACL in 2018. Following this, the Gujarat government holding dropped to 33% while the remaining 16% is held by the Delhi Mumbai Industrial Corridor Development Corporation (DMICDC).

The Airports Authority of India (AAI) signed a memorandum of understanding (MoU) with the State Government in January 2019 for the construction of airport.

In 2021, the Airport Authority of India  released a Rs. 987 crore tender for Phase 1 of airport project. The airport will have a 3,200 metre long runway suitable for 4E category aircraft. The airport is expected to cater to not only DSIR and its hinterland, but also to traffic overflow from the Ahmedabad international airport. The Gujarat government has allocated 1427 hectares of land for the said project and 75 hectares of government land, has been allocated for commercial development.

References

Airports in Gujarat
Proposed airports in Gujarat